Mick Baxter (born 30 December 1956 – 16 January 1989) was an English footballer who played as a defender for Preston North End, Middlesbrough and Portsmouth

He died of cancer in January 1989, aged 32.

References

External links
 

English footballers
Preston North End F.C. players
Middlesbrough F.C. players
Portsmouth F.C. players
1989 deaths
1956 births
Association football defenders